Mapeng Catholic Church is a Roman Catholic church located in Kecheng District of Quzhou, Zhejiang, China.

History 
The church was originally built in 1830, during the ruling of Daoguang Emperor (1821–1850) of the Qing dynasty (1644–1911). It was rebuilt in 1912. The whole villagers are Catholics. In January 2011, it was inscribed as a provincial cultural relic preservation organ by the Zhejiang government.

Architecture 
The church complex is located in the west and faces the east with brief layout, it includes the church, priest's house, nun's house, Peixin Primary School, nursery and missionary cemetery.

References

Further reading 
 
 

Churches in Zhejiang
1830s establishments in China
Churches completed in 1830
Tourist attractions in Quzhou